Maurice Beatson (born 27 August 1953) is a New Zealand equestrian. He competed in two events at the 1988 Summer Olympics.

References

External links
 

1953 births
Living people
New Zealand male equestrians
Olympic equestrians of New Zealand
Equestrians at the 1988 Summer Olympics
Sportspeople from Hastings, New Zealand